Yang Jung-min (born 21 May 1986) is a South Korean football defender.

He was arrested on the charge connected with the match fixing allegations on 29 May 2011. On 17 June 2011, his football career was rescinded by the Korea Professional Football League with other accomplices.

References

External links
 K-League Player Record 

1986 births
Living people
Association football defenders
South Korean footballers
Daejeon Hana Citizen FC players
K League 1 players
Sportspeople banned for life